Old Moat is a suburban area of Manchester, England. The population of its electoral ward at the 2011 census was 14,490.

History

Old Moat estate 
The "Old Moat estate" is a large estate of 1920s built social housing named after a former manor house with a surrounding moat, which was the seat of the lord of the manor, and was situated in what is now the heart of the estate. The site of the manor house is marked by a plaque on number 22 Eddisbury Avenue. The housing is now mostly owned by Southway Housing Trust.

Governance 

The area is represented in Westminster by Jeff Smith MP for Manchester Withington.

Voters from this ward elect three councillors to Manchester City Council. Currently all three councillors, Gavin White, Suzannah Reeves and Garry Bridges are members of the Labour Party. The Labour Party has held all the seats in the ward since 1986.

Geography 
It is bounded by Wilmslow Road to the East and Princess Road to the West. The Northern boundary bisects several roads just below Wilbraham Road, whilst in the South it follows a path just above Cavendish Road.

Education and policing

Primary schools 
The area is served by Old Moat Primary School, on Old Moat Lane.

Policing 
Old Moat is covered by the South Manchester Division of Greater Manchester Police. The local Neighbourhood Policing Team is the Didsbury Neighbourhood Policing Team, which covers Didsbury, Old Moat, Withington and Burnage and is headed up by Inspector Dave Nutsey. Didsbury Police Station is situated in the heart of Didsbury village on Wilmslow Road.

References

Areas of Manchester